Tsentralny District is a district of the federal city of St. Petersburg, Russia. As of the 2010 Census, its population was 214,625; down from 236,856 recorded in the 2002 Census.

Geography
The district borders the Neva River in the north and in the east, Obvodny Canal in the south, and areas around the Gorokhovaya Street in the west.

History
The district was established on March 11, 1994 as a result of the merger of Dzerzhinsky, Kuybyshevsky, and Smolninsky Districts.

Municipal divisions
Tsentralny District comprises the following six municipal okrugs:
#78
Dvortsovy
Ligovka-Yamskaya
Liteyny
Smolninskoye
Vladimirsky

Economy
Head office of the Rossiya airline is located in Vladimirsky Municipal Okrug of the district.

References

Notes

Sources

 
States and territories established in 1994